The Moscow Aviation Institute BB-MAI was a Soviet light bomber/attack plane prototype aircraft. Designed in 1939 by Peter Grushin of the Moscow Aviation Institute (MAI, hence the designation), it was delayed by problems with the new Klimov M-105 engine and eventually only a single prototype was built. While the design was not accepted for serial production, it was the first Soviet aircraft to use a tricycle landing gear and one of the first to feature a supercharger and leading-edge slats.

Design and development

The work on the design was started in 1938, but was delayed by the fact that the intended powerplant, the modern Klimov M-105 engine, was still under development. In early 1939 work commenced on the first prototype, but proceeded at a very slow pace. The construction team was led by A.A. Lebedinski and A.A. Manucharov. It was not until late 1940 that the prototype was completed and flight-tested by MAI's own test pilot A.N. Grinchik. By that time the Soviet Air Forces lost interest in the design and focused on the more advanced Ilyushin Il-2 instead. As neither this design nor the even more revolutionary Sh-MAI were accepted, the Design Bureau of the Moscow Aviation Institute was disbanded and its head Pyotr Grushin was sent to Kharkov as the new head of a local Aircraft Factory No. 135.

The two-spar wings of BB-MAI were of mixed construction typical to other Soviet experimental designs of the era. Each wing was equipped with leading-edge slats and was composed of three crescent-shaped caisson sections, each formed of fanera – layers of plywood strengthened with glue and bakelite. The fuselage was a typical wooden monocoque reinforced with fanera. The materials used in the BB-MAI were designed at the VIAM Institute. The relatively small wings resulted in relatively high wing loading to maximise the aircraft's cruising speed.

The engine was equipped with a new experimental TsIAM supercharger powered by exhaust fumes. The aircraft was equipped with a modern tricycle landing gear, with the front wheel retracting into a bay in front of the engine's radiator, while main gears retracted into wing bays close to the fuselage.

Specifications (BB-MAI)

References

Notes

Bibliography

External links
 Pictures of the prototype

World War II Soviet ground attack aircraft
World War II Soviet bombers
Abandoned military aircraft projects of the Soviet Union